15 Doors is the second studio album by Japanese pop duo Moumoon. It was released on March 2, 2011 in 3 different editions: 2 CD+DVD (Type A comes with all music videos released until "15 Doors" and type B comes with a live concert) and a Regular edition.

Composition
All songs from the album was written by the member Yuka and produced by the member Kousuke Masaki.

Singles
The album has a total of 5 singles released. The first single of the album is the song "Evergreen", released on February 25, 2009. The physical single ranked #54 in Oricon's Weekly chart. The song was chosen as theme song for the movie Kafu wo Machiwabite and ending theme song for the TV shows Akko ni Omakase and Megadigi, both from TBS.

The second single is the song "On the Right", released on July 22, 2009. It ranked #50 in Oricon's Weekly chart and stayed on the chart for 1 week. The song was used for Dinos "Fuji TV Flower" TV advertisement.

The third single is the song "Aoi Tsuki to Ambivalence na Ai", released on November 25, 2009. It ranked #36 in Oricon's Weekly chart and stayed on the chart for 2 weeks. The song was chosen as ending theme song for the 3D anime "To (Too)".

The fourth single is the song "Sunshine Girl", released on May 12, 2010. The single ranked #10 in Oricon's Weekly chart, making the first top 10 single of the duo. The song was chosen as theme song for Shiseido's "Anessa" and Sony Ericsson × MTV "Transform Your Xperia" TV advertisements.

The fifth and last single are the songs "Moonlight / Sky High / YAY", released on November 10, 2010. It is the first triple A-side single of the duo. It ranked #18 in Oricon's Weekly chart. "Moonlight" was used as theme song for Aeon's "Full Moon Rose" TV advertisement. "Sky High" was used as "H.I.S." campaign song. Although all songs are A-sides, the song "Sky High" didn't enter in the album.

Track listing 

 The full version of the track "We Go", previously released as an intro, was released on the following album No Night Land.

Charts

Oricon Chart

Other charts

Release history

References

External links
 15 Doors special website

2011 albums
Japanese-language albums
Avex Group albums
Moumoon albums